Neope goschkevitschii is a Nymphalidae butterfly found in East Asia. This species looks quite similar to Neope niphonica and these two species were treated as one for a long time.

References

Elymniini
Butterflies of Japan
Butterflies described in 1857